Firebase Mile High (also known as LZ Mile High or Hill 1198) was a U.S. Army firebase located northwest of Kontum in the Central Highlands of Vietnam.

History
Mile High was established by the 1st Battalion, 35th Infantry in March 1968 approximately 32 km northwest of Kontum.

Other units based at Mile High included:
1st Battalion, 12th Infantry
4th Battalion, 4th Artillery

Current use
The base has reverted to jungle.

See also
Landing Zone Brillo Pad
Landing Zone Virgin

References

Installations of the United States Army in South Vietnam
Buildings and structures in Kon Tum province